Alexander Poynton OBE (8 August 1853 – 9 January 1935) was an Australian politician. He held ministerial office under Prime Minister Billy Hughes, serving as Treasurer (1916–1917), Minister for Home and Territories (1920–1921), and Postmaster-General (1921–1923).

Poynton was a shearer and union leader before entering politics. He served in the South Australian House of Assembly (1893–1901) as a supporter of the labour movement before winning election to the House of Representatives at the 1901 federal election. Following the Australian Labor Party split of 1916 he followed Hughes into the Nationalist Party. He lost his seat at the 1922 election.

Early life
Poynton was born on 8 August 1853 in Castlemaine, Victoria. He was the son of Rosanna (née McFadden) and Alexander Poynton; his mother was Irish and his father was from Liverpool, England. He left school at the age of 14 and subsequently worked as a miner, station-hand, and shearer. He married Harriet Brown in Ballarat in 1880.

Poynton was involved in the Australian labour movement from its beginnings. He was president of the Creswick branch of the Amalgamated Miners' Association and in 1886 became the inaugural treasurer of the Amalgamated Shearers' Union of Australasia (ASU). The following year he moved to Port Augusta, South Australia, to work as an ASU organiser. He was secretary of the local branch.

Colonial politics
With his support in the labour movement, Poynton unsuccessfully stood for the South Australian House of Assembly seat of Newcastle at the 1890 election, before his election to the adjacent seat of Flinders at the 1893 election, serving as an Independent Labor MP. As an Independent Labor MP he attended the United Labor Party caucus meetings without being bound by its decisions, but supported it in divisions.

By 1899, however, disaffection with Premier Charles Kingston led him to cross the floor with four others to defeat his ministry, citing Kingston's overbearing nature and his tardiness in implementing adequate land reforms as motives. His actions earned him a place as Commissioner for Crown Lands in the Solomon ministry in 1899, which lasted only eight days. Poynton's decisive role in ousting Kingston lost him many Labor friends.

He served in the House of Assembly until 1901.

Federal politics

In 1901 Poynton successfully stood for the Australian House of Representatives in the inaugural federal election as a Free Trade Party member for the Division of South Australia (which was not divided into electorates). Though labelled a Free Trader, he was actually an Australasian National League (National Defence League) candidate. At the 1903 election, South Australia was split into single-member electorates, and Poynton was elected as the first member for the Division of Grey in the vast northern region of South Australia. In May 1904 he became a pledged Labour member.

During his time in parliament Poynton served variously as a member of the royal commission on stripper harvesters, chairman of committees, Treasurer, Minister for Home and Territories and Postmaster-General. Among his political achievements was the establishment of a railway between Port Augusta and Western Australia, for which he lobbied nearly 18 years.

During fiery internal party debates on the issue of conscription during World War I, Poynton became a strong conscriptionist.  Along with several other pro-conscription Labor members, he left the party in November 1916 in support of Labor leader and Prime Minister Billy Hughes to help found first the National Labor Party and later the Nationalist Party.  Appointed OBE in 1920 for his work on repatriation issues, Poynton was defeated at the 1922 election.

Death
He died in Toorak Gardens and was buried in North Road Cemetery. His wife, a son and four daughters survived him.

References
 ___ Details of Poynton's OBE
 van den Hoorn, R. (1988) 'Poynton, Alexander (1853–1935)', Australian Dictionary of Biography, Volume 11, Melbourne University Press, Carlton.

Notes

Australian Labor Party members of the Parliament of Australia
Free Trade Party members of the Parliament of Australia
Nationalist Party of Australia members of the Parliament of Australia
Officers of the Order of the British Empire
Treasurers of Australia
Members of the Australian House of Representatives for Grey
Members of the Australian House of Representatives
Members of the Cabinet of Australia
1935 deaths
1853 births
National Labor Party members of the Parliament of Australia
Burials at North Road Cemetery
20th-century Australian politicians